A Mouthful is the debut album by French/Finnish indie rock band The Dø, released on 14 January 2008. It spawned two singles: "On My Shoulders" (2007) and "At Last!" (2008). The album was given a US release in April 2010, featuring additional versions of three of the album's songs as bonus tracks.

Track listing
All songs written by Olivia Bouyssou Merilahti and Dan Levy.
"Playground Hustle" – 2:55
"At Last!" – 4:09
"On My Shoulders" – 5:21
"Song for Lovers" – 2:24
"The Bridge Is Broken" – 4:42
"Stay (Just a Little Bit More)" – 3:06
"Unissasi laulelet" – 2:19
"Tammie" – 3:15
"Queen Dot Kong" – 3:14
"Coda" – 1:57
"Searching Gold" – 5:10
"When Was I Last Home?" – 3:34
"Travel Light" – 4:02
"Aha" – 4:19
"In My Box" – 1:48

Bonus tracks on the US release

Critical reception

Pitchfork Media gave the album a rating of 7.5 out of 10, noting "[A Mouthful] tries to balance the mature and the immature" and that "[Olivia B. Merilahti and Dan Levy] aren't shy about toying with musical categories (...) which compensates for the less-than-advisable inclusions, and the record is as ambitious and fun as any coming-out party in recent memory", but criticizing the lack of a better quality control.

Drowned in Sound gave it a rating of 9 out of 10, saying the band is like "a female Eminem backed with a brass band" or "PJ Harvey on the Moon".

French magazine Les Inrockuptibles gave a positive review, calling them a "cool and promising band".

The album was nominated for the Prix Constantin in 2008 but did not win.

Charts
A Mouthful topped the French charts in its first week. It is the first English-sung pop French record to top the albums chart in France.

Sales

It was awarded a gold certification from the Independent Music Companies Association which indicated sales of at least 100,000 copies throughout Europe.

References

2008 debut albums
The Dø albums
European Border Breakers Award-winning albums